Open Message Queue (OpenMQ or Open MQ) is an open-source
message-oriented middleware project by Oracle (formerly Sun Microsystems) that implements the Java Message Service 2.0 API (JMS). It is the default JMS provider integrated into GlassFish.

In addition to support for the JMS API, OpenMQ provides additional enterprise features including clustering for scalability and high availability, a C API, and a full JMX administration API. It also includes an implementation of the Java EE Connector Architecture (JCA) called the JMSRA, that allows OpenMQ to be used by a Java EE compliant application server.

See also
 Message-oriented middleware

References

Java enterprise platform
Message-oriented middleware